Bomber is a two-part British television miniseries, written by Rob Heyland, that first broadcast on ITV on 5 January 2000. The series, based on an idea by Leslie Grantham, stars Mark Strong and Andrew Lincoln as the leaders of a group of bomb disposal experts working for the British Army. The series was produced by Zenith Entertainment, in collaboration with Archie Tate productions.

Series writer Rob Heyland said that several years prior to transmission, the series would not have been possible. "I don't think I would have had access to the EOD [Explosive Ordnance Disposal] people for a start. They were incredibly sweet and accommodating and quite amused by the idea of a tubby idiot coming in and saying, 'I'm going to write a story about you.' I spent a lot of time with them, I watched them training and I got all sorts of information that, previously, you would have had to be John Pilger to get access to."

Due to the sensitive nature of the programme title, the series was not broadcast in Ireland, instead being replaced in the schedules by Die Hard with a Vengeance. The first episode gathered an audience of 7.62 million viewers. The series was released on VHS in Japan in 2001; currently remaining the only home video release worldwide. However, in 2017, Simply Media acquired the rights to the series, suggesting a possible DVD release in 2018.

Cast
 Mark Strong as Col. Chris Forsyth
 Andrew Lincoln as Capt. Willy Byrne
 Esther Hall as Capt. Charlie Weekly
 Teresa Churcher as Jane Smith
 Isabel Brook as Lucy Whelan
 Andy Rashleigh as DCS Brian Brannigan
 Rufus Wright as Capt. Hugh Smith
 Donald Douglas as Alfred Smith
 Jan Carey as Mary Smith
 Geraldine Alexander as Rose Forsyth
 David Hounslow as Maj. Spencer
 Denzil Kilvington as Desmond Dohenry
 Ieuan Rhys as Cpl. Owens
 Ian Peck as LCpl. Phillips
 Tim Treloar as Cpl. Sorrento
 William Whymper as Gen. Harris
 Luke Shaw as David McGarry
 Russell Bright as Kevin Prescott
 Sally Carman as Bridget Salsabill
 Gareth Forwood as Hilary Quentin
 Nick Whitfield as Pierre Pfieffer
 Bob Mercer as DC Dempsey

Episodes

References

External links

2000 British television series debuts
2000 British television series endings
2000s British drama television series
ITV television dramas
2000s British television miniseries
English-language television shows
British television films